The 11th Annual Helpmann Awards for live performance in Australia were held on 1 August 2011 at the Joan Sutherland Theatre, Sydney Opera House.

Winners and nominees
In the following tables, winners are listed first and highlighted in boldface. The nominees are those which are listed below the winner and not in boldface

Theatre

Musicals

Opera and Classical Music

Dance and Physical Theatre

Contemporary Music

Other

Industry

References

External links
The official Helpmann Awards website

Helpmann Awards
Helpmann Awards
Helpmann Awards
Helpmann Awards
Helpmann Awards, 11th
Helpmann Awards